Boere-Vryheidsbeweging is a Boer Liberation Political Movement, advocating an independent homeland for Boer/Afrikaners based on the old Transvaal and Orange Free State Republics, which lost their independence to British colonialism after the Boer War.

External links
Official Site of the BVB 

Separatism in South Africa